The Clark House, also known as the Rev. Francis E. Clark House, is an historic house at located at 379 Central Street in the village of Auburndale in Newton, Massachusetts.  It is a -story wood-frame structure, with a cross-gable configuration that has a large circular three-story tower at the corner, topped by a conical roof.  It has a variety of gables, projections, and window shapes and placement, characteristics of the Queen Anne style of architecture.  It was built in 1895 for Rev. Francis Edward Clark, founder of the Young People's Society of Christian Endeavour. On September 4, 1986, the house was added to the National Register of Historic Places.

See also
 National Register of Historic Places listings in Newton, Massachusetts

References

Houses on the National Register of Historic Places in Newton, Massachusetts
Queen Anne architecture in Massachusetts
Houses completed in 1895
Shingle Style houses
Shingle Style architecture in Massachusetts